"Save Your Love" is a song which, when performed by duo Renée and Renato, was a UK number-one hit in December 1982. It remained at the top of the chart for four weeks before being overtaken by Phil Collins' cover of "You Can't Hurry Love". The song was written by Johnny Edward (creator and voice of fictional robot TV character Metal Mickey) and his wife Sue. Edward also produced the song and released it on his own label, Hollywood Records.

"Save Your Love" entered the UK Singles Chart on 13 November 1982 at number 38. However, it began to pick up sales during the Christmas period, and six weeks after its debut was at the top of the charts, resulting in it being played on Top of the Pops and many radio stations.  It was the first ever completely indie number one, and it sold some 980,000 copies. Renée (whose real name was Hilary Lester), did not appear in the video for "Save Your Love"; instead, she was replaced by a model.

Chart performance

Weekly charts

Year-end charts

Critical reception
"Save Your Love" was ranked at Number 5 on a Daily Telegraph list of the "Worst Christmas number ones of all time".

Cover version
A Dutch version with the title "Niemand laat zijn eigen kind alleen" ("No one leaves their own child alone") was recorded by Willy Alberti with his daughter Willeke. This version reached Number 4 in the Dutch charts in 1982.

References

External links
 John Edward's page about the song

1982 debut singles
Kikki Danielsson songs
Dutch Top 40 number-one singles
UK Singles Chart number-one singles
Irish Singles Chart number-one singles
Number-one singles in Israel
Number-one singles in Norway
Vikingarna (band) songs
Male–female vocal duets
Christmas number-one singles in the United Kingdom
UK Independent Singles Chart number-one singles